Kim Laura Hnizdo (born 13 April 1996 in Bad Homburg vor der Höhe) is a German model and the winner of Germany's Next Topmodel in 2016.

Life 

Hnizdo graduated from the Humboldtschule in Bad Homburg, and began to study law at the Justus Liebig University of Giessen.

She is the winner of the eleventh season of the castingshow Germany's Next Topmodel. As the winner, Hnizdo received a model contract with the Model Agency ONEeins, an Opel Adam and prize money to the amount of €100,000.

References 
1. ↑ Kim Hnizdo Steckbrief. In: top.de. Retrieved, 13 May 2016.
2. ↑ Olga Scheer: Auftritt bei „Victoria's Secret" als Traum. In: Frankfurter Allgemeine Zeitung. 4 May 2016, retrieved 13 May 2016.
3. ↑ "Germany's next Topmodel 2016"-Star Kim Hnizdo Erste Worte der Gewinnerin. In: ProSieben. 13 May 2016, retrieved 13 May 2016.

Living people
1996 births
People from Bad Homburg vor der Höhe
German female models
Germany's Next Topmodel winners